Papuadytes is a genus of beetles in the family Dytiscidae, containing the following species:

Papuadytes desii (Balke, 1999)
Papuadytes fume (Balke, 1998)

References

Dytiscidae